Lassana Camará  (born 29 December 1991), commonly known as Saná, is a Bissau-Guinean footballer who plays as a central midfielder. He also holds Portuguese citizenship.

Club career
Born in Bissau, Guinea Bissau, Saná spent four years in S.L. Benfica's academy, scoring two goals in 33 games in his last year as a junior. He started his professional career at Servette FC in Switzerland: having arrived injured from the 2010 UEFA European Under-19 Championship, he only returned to competition in January 2011, and played just 257 minutes in the second division campaign as the João Alves-led side – a former Benfica player and also his youth manager – attained Super League promotion.

Saná signed a three-year contract with Real Valladolid in Spain on 9 July 2011. At the end of his first and only season the team promoted to La Liga after a two-year absence, but he only totalled 33 minutes of action and was released after several problems with the management and the board of directors.

On 30 August 2014, after nearly two years without a club and a brief spell in Brazil, Saná joined S.C. Braga, being assigned to the reserves in the Segunda Liga. He remained in that tier the following years, being rarely played at Académico de Viseu F.C. and Leixões SC.

Saná moved to SCM Gloria Buzău of the Romanian Liga III in late January 2019.

International career
Saná won 51 caps for Portugal at youth level, including 13 for the under-20s. He helped them reach the final at the 2011 FIFA World Cup, appearing in three matches.

Saná switched allegiance to Guinea Bissau in 2014, making his debut on 2 August by playing 59 minutes in a 1–1 home draw against Botswana for the 2015 Africa Cup of Nations qualifiers.

Honours

Club
Gloria Buzău
Liga III: 2018–19

International
Portugal U20
FIFA U-20 World Cup runner-up: 2011

Orders
 Knight of the Order of Prince Henry

References

External links

1991 births
Living people
Bissau-Guinean emigrants to Portugal
Naturalised citizens of Portugal
Sportspeople from Bissau
Bissau-Guinean footballers
Portuguese footballers
Association football midfielders
Liga Portugal 2 players
Campeonato de Portugal (league) players
S.L. Benfica footballers
Associação Académica de Coimbra – O.A.F. players
S.C. Braga B players
S.C. Braga players
Académico de Viseu F.C. players
Leixões S.C. players
S.C. Olhanense players
Swiss Challenge League players
Servette FC players
Segunda División players
Real Valladolid players
Liga II players
FC Gloria Buzău players
Portugal youth international footballers
Portugal under-21 international footballers
Guinea-Bissau international footballers
2017 Africa Cup of Nations players
Bissau-Guinean expatriate footballers
Expatriate footballers in Switzerland
Expatriate footballers in Spain
Expatriate footballers in Brazil
Expatriate footballers in Romania
Bissau-Guinean expatriate sportspeople in Switzerland
Bissau-Guinean expatriate sportspeople in Spain
Bissau-Guinean expatriate sportspeople in Brazil
Bissau-Guinean expatriate sportspeople in Romania